Irena Laskowska (15 March 1925 – 6 December 2019) was a Polish actress. She appeared in more than 40 films and television shows between 1948 and 2003.

Selected filmography
 The Last Day of Summer (1958)
 Milczące ślady (1961)
 Salto (1965)
 Hunting Flies (1969)
 Everything for Sale (1969)
 Pornografia (2003)

References

External links

1925 births
2019 deaths
Polish film actresses
Actresses from Kraków
Polish stage actresses
Recipient of the Meritorious Activist of Culture badge